Christian Nüchtern (born 28 January 1992) is a former German competitive ice dancer. With skating partner Shari Koch, he is the 2014 Bavarian Open silver medalist, 2017 Winter Universiade bronze medalist, and 2019 German national champion.

Career 
Nüchtern started learning to skate in 1994. He and Koch made their international debut at the 2008 NRW Trophy. They placed in the top ten at the 2012 and 2013 World Junior Championships and won the German junior national title three times (2011–13).

Koch/Nüchtern won their first senior international medal, silver, at the 2014 Bavarian Open. After missing the entire 2014–15 season, they returned to international competition in February 2016 at the Bavarian Open. In February 2017, they received the bronze medal at the Winter Universiade in Almaty, Kazakhstan.

Programs 
(with Koch)

Competitive highlights 
GP: Grand Prix; CS: Challenger Series; JGP: Junior Grand Prix

With Koch

References

External links 

 

German male ice dancers
Universiade medalists in figure skating
1992 births
Living people
Sportspeople from Siegen
Universiade bronze medalists for Germany
Competitors at the 2017 Winter Universiade